Alice's Day at Sea was the first animated short film in the series of the Alice Comedies that was directed  Walt Disney. It was black and white and silent, and featured live action segments paired with animated sequences. It is a historically significant film as it was the first project created by the Disney Brothers Studio. Established by Roy and Walt Disney in Los Angeles on October 16, 1923, they worked from a rented back office of the Holly Vermont Realty located at 4651 Kingswell Avenue.  “Alice’s Day at Sea” was delivered to distributor M.J. Winkler on December 26, 1923, but wasn't released in theaters until March 1924.

Theatrical poster
According to the Guinness Book of World Records, the poster for this film was sold for $36,534 at Christie's auction, the most valuable cartoon poster of all time up until then. Since the publication of that list, the poster for The Mad Doctor (1933), starring Mickey Mouse, has sold for $138,000 at Heritage Auctions (March 2006).

References

External links
 Alice's Day at Sea at The Encyclopedia of Disney Animated Shorts

1920s Disney animated short films
American silent short films
American black-and-white films
1924 animated films
Films directed by Walt Disney
Alice Comedies
1924 comedy films
1924 films
Animated films without speech
1920s American films